Aulixidens eugeniae is a species of characin endemic to the Orinoco River basin in Venezuela. This species is the only member of its genus.

References

Characidae
Monotypic fish genera
Fish of Venezuela